Glen Roy is a valley in the Scottish Highlands..

Glen Roy or Glenroy may also refer to:

Australia 

Glenroy, New South Wales
Glenroy, Queensland, a locality in the Rockhampton Region
Glenroy, Victoria
Glenroy Football Club
Glenroy railway station
Glenroy Specialist School

British Crown Dependency 

Glen Roy (Isle of Man)

Canada 

 Glenroy, Ontario, Canada

New Zealand 

Glenroy, Canterbury, New Zealand

United States 

Glen Roy, Ohio, United States

See also